Zhongnanshan Tunnel, or Qinling Zhongnanshan Tunnel in Shaanxi province, China, is the longest two-tube road tunnel in China. It opened on 20 January 2007, becoming part of the Xi'an-Ankang Highway between the Changan and Zhashui counties. The cost to build the tunnel was 3.2 billion yuan (US$410 million). The maximum embedded depth of the tunnel is 1640 metres below surface level.

References 

Transport in Shaanxi
Buildings and structures in Shaanxi
Road tunnels in China
Tunnels completed in 2007
2007 establishments in China